Australia has participated in every edition of the World Athletics Championships since the inaugural event in 1983. Australia is 15th on the all time medal table. 

Australia has won 12 gold medals, with 9 individual winners, and 36 medals total. Cathy Freeman, Jana Pittman and Sally Pearson are Australia's only multiple gold medal winners, with two each; Freeman (bronze) and Pearson (silver) have also each won a place medal. Other multiple medalists are: Dimitri Markov (1 gold, 1 silver), Jared Tallent (3 silvers), Kerry Saxby-Junna (1 silver, 1 bronze) and Mitchell Watt (1 silver, 1 bronze). Australia's first World Championships medal was when by Robert De Castella won gold in the Men's marathon at the inaugural World Championships in 1983.

Medalists

Medal tables

By championships

By event

By gender

Doping disqualifications

See also
 Australia at the Olympics
 Australia at the Commonwealth Games
 Australia at the Summer Universiade

References

Nations at the World Athletics Championships
World Championships